Erik Poulsen (born 16 June 1967) is an Danish politician who has been serving as a Member of the European Parliament for the Venstre since 2022.

References

See also 

 List of members of the European Parliament for Denmark, 2019–2024

1967 births
Living people
21st-century Danish politicians
MEPs for Denmark 2019–2024
Venstre (Denmark) politicians
Venstre (Denmark) MEPs